HMS Success was a B-class torpedo boat destroyer of the Royal Navy.  She was launched on 21 March 1901.  On 27 December 1914 she was wrecked off Fife Ness during heavy gales.

Design and construction
HMS Success was ordered on 30 March 1899 from William Doxford & Sons as part of the British Admiralty's 1899–1900 shipbuilding programme, one of twelve "thirty-knotter" destroyers ordered from various shipyards under this programme. Success closely resembled Doxford's , ordered under the 1897–1898 programme, with the major difference being that the ship had three funnels rather than four.

Displacement was  light and  full load. Armament was as standard for the "thirty-knotters", with a QF 12 pounder 12 cwt ( calibre) gun on a platform on the ship's conning tower (also used as the ship's bridge), with a secondary armament of five 6-pounder guns, and two 18 inch (450 mm) torpedo tubes.

Success was laid down at Doxford's Sunderland shipyard as yard number 282 on 18 September 1899, launched on 21 March 1901 and completed in May 1902.

Service history

She succeeded the latter ship in the Portsmouth instructional flotilla, and took part in the fleet review held at Spithead on 16 August 1902 for the coronation of King Edward VII. Commander Hubert Brand was appointed in command on 20 December 1902, but left after only three weeks in mid-January 1903 to take up another command.

Notes

Citations

Bibliography
 
 
 
 
 
 
 
 
 

 

Lively-class destroyers
Ships built on the River Wear
1901 ships
B-class destroyers (1913)
World War I destroyers of the United Kingdom
Maritime incidents in December 1914
World War I shipwrecks in the North Sea